Massimo Sulli (born December 12, 1963) is an Italian former Olympic judoka.

Judo career
His sports club was G.S. Fiamme Gialle, in Rome, Italy.

Competing in the U71 weight class, Sulli won the 1983-91 Italian Judo Championships.

Sulli competed for Italy at the 1992 Summer Olympics in Barcelona, at the age of 28, in Judo--Men's Lightweight, and came in tied for 9th.

References 

Living people
Olympic judoka of Italy
1963 births
Italian male judoka
Judoka at the 1992 Summer Olympics
Judoka of Fiamme Gialle